Hanbando (Hangul: 한반도, Hanja:韓半島; lit. Korean peninsula) is a 2006 South Korean blockbuster film.

Plot
The North and South Korean governments are on the verge of reopening the Kyungui Railroad, which connects the two Koreas, as a further step toward reunification. Japan refuses to accept the decision, claiming rights to the railway lines based on official documents imprinted with the imperial seal of Emperor Gojong of Joseon a century ago.  Yet an age old conspiracy is uncovered where the imperial seal with which Emperor Gojong signed the documents is suspected to be fake. It is a race against time and hidden agendas as the South Korean president (Ahn Sung-ki) employs the outspoken historian Choi Min-jae (Cho Jae-hyun) and the descendant of the Joseon royal bloodline Kim Yu-shik (Kang Shin-il) to find the authentic seal and prevent the history of Japanese occupation from repeating itself. In the meantime, Japanese economic sanctions divide the South Korean government, and its armed forces appear on the border of South Korea threatening its sovereignty. Eventually, the authentic royal seal is found and Japan apologizes for its occupation.

Cast
Ahn Sung-ki as South Korean president
Cha In-pyo
Cho Jae-hyun as Choi Min-jae
Moon Sung-keun as Gwon Yong-hwan
Kang Shin-il as Kim Yu-shik
Shim Wan-joon as Navy CIC soldier

Reception
The JoongAng Ilbo gave the film a largely negative review, calling its plot far-fetched, the acting overdone, and criticizing its heavy-handed nationalism. The review commented positively on the accuracy of scenes in which the South Korean prime minister deals with businessmen, and on the "beautifully choreographed" though bloody depictions of historical events at the end of the Joseon Dynasty. According to the review, the conclusion of the film, in which Japan apologizes for its occupation of Korea, provides viewers with catharsis in a country in which anti-Japanese sentiment is still strong.

References

Further reading
  Alt URL

External links
 
 Review at koreanfilm.org

2006 films
South Korean mystery thriller films
2000s Korean-language films
Films directed by Kang Woo-suk
Films about Japan–Korea relations
2000s South Korean films